Michael J. Hindelang (born 1945 in Detroit, died March 27, 1982 in Schenectady, New York) was an American criminologist.

Early life and education
Hindelang was born in Detroit. He received his B.A. in psychology in 1966 and his master's degree in 1967, both from Wayne State University. He received his doctorate in criminology from the University of California, Berkeley in 1969.

Career
In 1970, Hindelang joined the faculty of the University at Albany, where he became a full professor in 1976. He remained on the faculty there until his death. In 1972, he founded the Criminal Justice Research Center at this university. While at the University at Albany he collaborated with, among other researchers, Travis Hirschi, on multiple research projects pertaining to delinquency.

Their collaboration produced a paper regarding the link between IQ and delinquency, as well as the 1981 book Measuring Delinquency, which was co-authored by Hindelang, Hirschi, and Joseph Weis. Hindelang and Hirschi, along with Michael R. Gottfredson, also collaborated on a paper criticizing research on the age-crime curve, a paper which later became one of Hirschi's most famous. However, as Hindelang's health declined, he became unable to contribute more to this paper toward the end of his life. He served as associate editor for the Journal of Research in Crime and Delinquency from 1977 to 1980.

Death
Hindelang died on March 27, 1982, of a brain tumor. He was 36 years old when he died.

Recognition
After Hindelang died in 1982, the Criminal Justice Research Center he founded at the University at Albany was renamed the Hindelang Criminal Justice Research Center. In 1991, the American Society of Criminology created the Michael J. Hindelang Award, which is given annually to a book that the Society thinks "makes the most outstanding contribution to research in criminology" of any book published in the three previous years.

References

1945 births
1982 deaths
People from Detroit
Wayne State University alumni
University of California, Berkeley alumni
University at Albany, SUNY faculty
American criminologists
Deaths from brain cancer in the United States